KSBV (93.7 FM, The River Rat) is a radio station broadcasting a classic rock music format. Licensed to Salida, Colorado, United States.  The station is currently owned by Marc Scott, through licensee Arkansas Valley Broadcasting, Inc.

References

External links

SBV
Classic rock radio stations in the United States
Radio stations established in 1975